Slătioara may refer to several places in Romania:

 Slătioara, Olt, a commune in Olt County
 Slătioara, Vâlcea, a commune in Vâlcea County
 Slătioara, a village in Strâmtura Commune, Maramureș County
 Slătioara, a village in Râșca Commune, Suceava County
 Slătioara, a village in Stulpicani Commune, Suceava County
 Slătioara, a tributary of the Gemenea in Suceava County
 Slătioara (Iza), a tributary of the Iza in Maramureș County
 Slătioara, a tributary of the Târzia in Neamț County